Bamboo and wooden slips were the main media for writing documents in China before the widespread introduction of paper during the first two centuries AD. (Silk was occasionally used, for example in the Chu Silk Manuscript, but was prohibitively expensive for most documents.)

The earliest surviving examples of wood or bamboo slips date from the 5th century BC during the Warring States period. However, references in earlier texts surviving on other media make it clear that some precursor of these Warring States period bamboo slips was in use as early as the late Shang period (from about 1250 BC). Bamboo or wooden strips were the standard writing material during the Han dynasty and excavated examples have been found in abundance. Subsequently, the invention of paper by Cai Lun during the Han dynasty began to displace bamboo and wooden strips from mainstream uses, and by the 4th century AD bamboo had been largely abandoned as a medium for writing in China.

The long, narrow strips of wood or bamboo typically carry a single column of brush-written text each, with space for several tens of visually complex ancient Chinese characters. Each strip of wood or bamboo is said to be as long as a chopstick and as wide as two. For longer texts, many slips were sewn together with hemp, silk, or leather and used to make a kind of folding book, called jiance or jiandu.

The custom of interring books made of the durable bamboo strips in royal tombs has preserved many works in their original form through the centuries. An important early find was the Jizhong discovery in 279 AD of a tomb of a king of Wei, though the original recovered strips have since disappeared. Several caches of great importance have been found in recent years.

Major collections

The Shanghai Museum corpus was purchased in Hong Kong the year after the Guodian tomb was excavated, and is believed to have been taken by tomb robbers from a tomb in the same area. The Tsinghua collection was donated by an alumnus who purchased it through auction, with no indication of its origin. The others were archaeologically excavated.

Accoutrements
One accoutrement used when writing on bamboo slips was a small knife which would be used to scrape away mistakes and make amendments. Decorated knives became a symbol of office for some officials indicating their power to amend and change records and edicts.

See also 

 Bamboo Annals
 Bamboo tally
 Chu Silk Manuscript
 Mawangdui Silk Texts
 Oracle bone

References

 
Chinese inventions
Writing media